Justin Lhérisson (10 February 1873, in Port-au-Prince – 15 November 1907) was a Haitian writer, lawyer, journalist, and teacher. He is best known for two novels, La Famille des Pititecaille (1905) and Zoune Chez sa Ninnaine (1906), and for being the author of the lyrics of Haiti's national anthem, La Dessalinienne.

Born in Port-au-Prince, Lhérisson held a law degree and worked as a lawyer, journalist, and teacher. As a history teacher, he published a book on the Spanish colonial period of Haiti's history. He also founded the periodical Le Soir and wrote two books of poetry, Les Chants de l'Aurore (1893) and Passe-temps (1893). Along with his contemporaries Frédéric Marcelin and Fernand Hibbert he worked to establish a uniquely Haitian novel.

References

1873 births
1907 deaths
Haitian educators
20th-century Haitian historians
Haitian journalists
19th-century Haitian lawyers
Haitian male novelists
Haitian male poets
National anthem writers
People from Port-au-Prince
19th-century Haitian novelists
19th-century Haitian poets
19th-century male writers
20th-century Haitian lawyers